(18 July 1904 – 9 November 1986) was a Japanese screenwriter, mostly of chanbara films. His real name was Minoru Yahiro. Leaving Meiji University before graduating, he began writing screenplays at Shōzō Makino's Makino Film Productions in 1927. He ended up penning hundreds of screenplays at many studios, such as Teikine, Shinkō Kinema, and Daiei. He also participated in the "Narutakimura" group, writing screenplays with Sadao Yamanaka, Hiroshi Inagaki, Eisuke Takizawa and others. He also wrote many books and received the Order of the Rising Sun in 1975.

Selected filmography
Sansho the Bailiff (山椒大夫 Sanshō Dayū) (1954)
Bloody Spear at Mount Fuji (血槍富士, Chiyari Fuji) (1955)
Ghost-Cat of Gojusan-Tsugi (怪猫五十三次, Kaibyo Gojusan-tsugi) (1956)
Yatarō gasa (弥太郎笠) (1957)
Freelance Samurai (桃太郎侍, Momotarō Zamurai) (1957)
Suzakumon (朱雀門) (1957)
The Loyal 47 Ronin (忠臣蔵, Chushingura) (1958)
The Demon of Mount Oe (1960)
The Snow Woman (1968)

References

External links

1904 births
1986 deaths
Writers from Fukuoka Prefecture
20th-century Japanese screenwriters